Thumpakhar is a village in Sindhupalchok District in the Bagmati Zone of central Nepal. In the 1991 Nepal census, it had a population of 5210, with 1023 houses.

References

Popular Villages in Thumpakhar 
Thumpakhar is a village development committee with many sattlements. Pakhardovan, Dhusine, Kuile, Sundanda, 9kilo, Patidanda, Rotomate, 8kilo are the popular villages.

Bhotekoshi River and Aaraniko Highway is the Extra Attraction Of this Village.

Populated places in Sindhupalchowk District